Levi Peak is a rock peak  northwest of Mount Stanley, at the western edge of Grindley Plateau, Antarctica. It was named by the Advisory Committee on Antarctic Names for Gene S. Levi, a meteorologist at Hallett Station in winter 1963 and summer 1964–65.

References

Mountains of the Ross Dependency
Shackleton Coast